In the 1995 Isle of Man TT motorcycle racing competition, Joey Dunlop won the Senior TT and Lightweight TT events and came second to Phillip McCallen in the Formula I race. Changes were introduced in that the Supersport 66 Race was scrapped, and 600cc machines raced in the Junior TT instead. In addition the Lightweight TT incorporated Supersport 400s and 250cc machines.

Results
Race 1 – TT Formula One

Race 2 – Sidecar Race A

Race 3 – Singles TT

Race 4 – Ultra Lightweight

Race 5 – Lightweight TT

Race 6 – Junior TT

Race 7 – Sidecar Race B

Race 8 – Senior TT

External links
Isle of Man TT winners

Isle of Man Tt
1995
Isle of Man TT
Isle